Peperomia vana is a species of epiphyte from the genus 'Peperomia'.

Etymology
The word "vana" came from the Latin word "vānus", which means empty, pointless, boastful, and deceptive.

Distribution
Peperomia vana is native to one country, which is Peru. Specimens can be found at a Verbatim elevation of 4593-5577 ft. 
Peru
Junín
Schunke Hacienda

References

vana
Flora of South America
Flora of Peru
Plants described in 1937
Taxa named by William Trelease